Marca may refer to:

Places
 Marca, Sălaj, a commune in Sălaj County, Romania
 Marca, a tributary of the Barcău in Sălaj County, Romania
 an alternative name for Merca, Somalia
 Marca District, in the province Recuay, Peru
 Marçà, a village of about 600 near Falset, Tarragona, Catalonia, Spain
 Eparchy of Marča, historical Orthodox bishopric in Croatia

Regions (marches)
 Marca is the Latin term for border regions known as a Marks or Marches
 Marca Aleramica, created in 961 in western Liguria and named after Aleramo
 Marca Anconetana, created in 1198 and centred on Macerata in eastern central Italy
 Marca di Ancona, the March of Ancona, an alternative name for the Marca Anconetana
 Marca Arduinica, or march of Turin, founded in 941 and named after Arduin Glaber
 Marca Geronis, a tenth-century march in Saxony, centred on Merseburg
 Marca Hispanica, or Spanish March, or March of Barcelona, created in 795
 Marca Januensis, centred on Genoa, an alternative name for the Marca Obertenga
 Marca Obertenga, created in 961 in eastern Liguria and named after Oberto I
 Marca Trevigiana, or March of Treviso, a medieval territory in Venetia
 Marca Veronensis et Aquileiensis, or March of Verona, created after 945 and centred on Verona and Aquileia

People
 Conrad Marca-Relli (1913–2000), an American artist

Biology
 Marca (moth), a genus of moths of the family Erebidae
 Marca's marmoset, marmoset species endemic to Brazil

Other uses
 Marca (newspaper), a Spanish daily sports newspaper
 Marca da bollo, an Italian revenue stamp
 Marca registrada, Spanish and Portuguese term for trademark
 Marca-Tre-Spade, an Italian automobile manufactured from 1908 until 1911
 Marca Trevigiana Calcio a 5, a futsal club from Castelfranco Veneto, Italy.

See also
Marka (disambiguation)